Auguste François Chomel (13 April 1788 in Paris – 9 April 1858 in Morsang-sur-Orge) was a French pathologist.

Biography 
He was a professor at the Hôpital de la Charité in Paris, and in 1827 succeeded René Laennec (1781–1826) as chair of clinical medicine of the Faculté de Paris. In 1852 he declined swearing allegiance to Napoleon III, and thus was deemed having resigned his post.

Chomel was an important member of the pathological anatomy movement of early 19th century France that was based on the scientific research of Xavier Bichat (1771–1802), René Laënnec and Gaspard Laurent Bayle (1774–1816). In 1828 he provided the first description of a type of acute polyneuritis that would later be known as Guillain–Barré–Strohl syndrome.

Worthington Hooker (1806–1867), in his 1847 book Physician and Patient, gives Chomel credit for the first contemporary usage of the medical axiom, Primum non nocere ("First, do no harm").

Works

Selection 
 Éléments de pathologie générale (Elements of general pathology); numerous editions: 1817, 1840; on line : 4th ed., 1866.
 Des fièvres et des maladies pestilentielles (Fevers and pestilential diseases), 1821.
 Des dyspepsies (On dyspepsias), 1856. at Gallica
 Leçons de clinique (Clinical lessons), 1834–1840. at Gallica

List of online works 
 Online works on Gallica

References 

 Guillain–Barré–Strohl syndrome @ Who Named It

External links
 

French pathologists
19th-century French physicians
1788 births
1858 deaths
19th-century French writers
French medical writers
French male non-fiction writers
19th-century French male writers